American actress and singer Lindsay Lohan began her career as a child actor in the 1990s and has since appeared in numerous film and television projects among other productions. Lohan made her motion picture debut in Disney's commercially and critically successful remake of The Parent Trap (1998). She continued her acting career by appearing in a number of Disney films, including Freaky Friday (2003), which remains her highest-grossing film, Confessions of a Teenage Drama Queen (2004) and Herbie: Fully Loaded (2005). Her first non-Disney film, Mean Girls (2004), became a massive success by grossing over $129 million worldwide and later became a cult classic. Lohan also did smaller, more mature roles in which she received positive reviews on her acting including A Prairie Home Companion (2005), Bobby (2006) and Chapter 27 (2007). Between 2006 and 2007, Lohan continued her career by starring in films like Just My Luck (2006), Georgia Rule (2007) and I Know Who Killed Me (2007). Lohan's career faced many interruptions from legal and personal troubles during the mid to late 2000s, with her acting work becoming more sporadic in the following decade. She then had leading roles in Labor Pains (2009), Machete (2010), Liz & Dick (2012) and The Canyons (2013). She made her stage debut in the London West End production of Speed-the-Plow (2014). In 2022, Lohan signed a multi-picture deal with Netflix to star in her first major productions in over a decade, the romantic comedies Falling for Christmas (2022) and Irish Wish (2023).

Film

Television

Theatre

Music videos

Web

Commercials

Other media

References

Lohan, Lindsay
Filmographies
Lohan, Lindsay